Courtney is a tiny lunar impact crater on the Mare Imbrium, a lunar mare in the northwest quadrant of the Moon. It lies about two crater diameters to the northwest of Euler, in an otherwise isolated stretch of the mare. The dark surface in this region is marked by Euler's ray material. The name is an English male name.

References

External links

Impact craters on the Moon
Mare Imbrium